Yevgeny Olegovich Adamov (born April 28, 1939) was the head of the Russian atomic energy ministry, MinAtom.  He was appointed by President Boris Yeltsin in 1998 and ousted by President Vladimir Putin in 2001.

Adamov, a nuclear physicist, then joined the Dollezhal Institute. From 1986 until 1998, Adamov directed NIKIET, a Russian government nuclear research and design institute. 

In 2005, he was arrested in Bern, Switzerland, on fraud charges. the arrest was made at the request of the United States.  The US accused Adamov of diverting up to US$9 million which the US Energy Department gave Russia to help improve security at its nuclear facilities.  Extradition requests were filed first by the US and then by Russia, which has protested about the move by the US. Adamov was finally extradited to Russia. The move was widely covered as a successful ploy by the Russian government to prevent Adamov from telling US authorities state secrets that he knew.  

In 2008, Adamov was convicted in Russia of abuse of office and defrauding the Russian government of some $31 million in United States aid funds intended for security upgrades for aging nuclear reactors. 

On February 20, 2008, he was convicted by the Zamoskvoretsky court in Moscow, Russia of fraud and misuse of power and sentenced to 5.5 years of imprisonment.

He was released from jail when his sentence was suspended by a higher-level court on April 17, 2008.

References

External links
 Investigation by Novaya Gazeta (Russian)

Living people
Moscow Aviation Institute alumni
Russian physicists
Russian nuclear physicists
1939 births
Russian fraudsters
People extradited from Switzerland
People extradited to Russia